Nicolas Winding Refn (born 29 September 1970), also known as Jang, is a Danish film director, screenwriter, and producer. He is known for his collaborations with Mads Mikkelsen, Tom Hardy and Ryan Gosling. 

He gained great success early in his career directing the Pusher trilogy (1996–2005), the crime drama Bronson (2008), and the adventure film Valhalla Rising (2009). In 2011 he gained newfound stardom directing the action drama film Drive (2011) for which he won the Cannes Film Festival Award for Best Director. He was also nominated for the BAFTA Award for Best Direction. Refn's next films were the stylistically driven action film Only God Forgives (2013), and the psychological horror film The Neon Demon (2016). In 2019, he directed his first television series Too Old to Die Young (2019) which premiered on Amazon Prime.

In 2008, Refn co-founded the Copenhagen-based production company Space Rocket Nation.

Early life 
Refn was born in Copenhagen, Denmark, and raised partly in New York, United States. Refn's parents are Danish film director and editor Anders Refn and cinematographer Vibeke Winding. His half-brother is Kasper Winding, who has become a singer in Denmark.

He attended the American Academy of Dramatic Arts but was expelled for throwing a table into a wall.

Career

1996–2005: Early career and the Pusher trilogy 
Refn made his directorial debut with the Danish crime film Pusher (1996). It garnered a Best Supporting Actor Award for Zlatko Burić at the 1997 Bodil Awards.

Refn then directed Bleeder (1999), which featured much of the same cast from the Pusher Trilogy, including actors such as Kim Bodnia and Mads Mikkelsen. Refn won the FIPRESCI prize for the film at the 2000 Sarajevo Film Festival the work won Best Lighting at the Robert Festival. The film was nominated for Best Film and Best Supporting Actress at the 2000 Bodil Awards, as well as for the Grand Prix Asturias for Best Feature at the 1999 Gijon International Film Festival.

In 2003, Refn directed and wrote his first English-language film, Fear X, which starred John Turturro and was shot in Canada. Although a financial disappointment, the Danish-Canadian production won an International Fantasy Film Award for Best Screenplay at the 2004 Fantasporto Film Festival, and was nominated for best actor awards (for Turturro) at the Bodil Awards and the Fangoria Awards, and best film awards at festivals including Sitges Film Festival and the Sochi International Film Festival.

Refn later made two sequels to Pusher, Pusher II (2004) (a.k.a. Pusher II: With Blood on My Hands) and Pusher 3 (2005) (a.k.a. Pusher III: I'm The Angel of Death). For Pusher II, lead actor Mads Mikkelsen won a Best Actor award at the 2005 Bodil Awards, Best Actor at the 2005 Robert Festival (where the film was also nominated for Best Director, Best Screenplay and Best Film, among other nominations), and Best Actor at the 2005 Zulu Awards. The film was remade as a British version in 2012, Pusher, directed by Luis Prieto and executive produced by Refn.

2005–2011: Critical acclaim 
In 2008, Refn returned to the European art house film circuit after his unsuccessful Hollywood venture Fear X.  He wrote and directed Bronson (2008), which starred Tom Hardy as the title character, the U.K. prisoner Charles Bronson, noted for mental illness, violence and art. The film won Best Film at the 2009 Sydney Film Festival, and was also nominated for the Grand Jury Prize (World Cinema — Dramatic) at the 2009 Sundance Film Festival. Hardy won a Best Actor award at the 2009 British Independent Film Awards for his portrayal of Charles Bronson (and the film was nominated for a Best Achievement in Production award as well). Hardy was nominated for Best Actor by the Evening Standard British Film Awards and the London Critics Circle Film Awards.

In 2009, Refn teamed up again with frequent collaborator Mads Mikkelsen to write and direct Valhalla Rising, a surrealistic period piece about the Viking era. The film won an International Fantasy Film Special Jury Award and Special Mention at the 2010 Fantasporto Festival, and won the Titra Film Award for Refn at the 2010 Neuchatel International Fantastic Film Festival. The film also won a Best Make-Up award at the 2011 Robert Festival.

2011–2016: Hollywood breakthrough 

In 2011, Refn directed the American action drama film Drive (2011). It premiered in competition at the 2011 Cannes Film Festival, where he received the Best Director Award.

The film earned Refn a BAFTA nomination for directing. The film was also nominated in 2012 for an Academy Award for Best Sound Editing, a Golden Globe Award for Best Supporting Actor - Motion Picture nomination for Albert Brooks, Excellence in Production Design Award from the Art Directors Guild, won Best Director, Best Screenplay (for Hossein Amini) and Best Supporting Actor (for Brooks) at the Austin Film Critics Awards, won Boston Society of Film Critics Awards for Best Supporting Actor (Albert Brooks) and Best Use of Music in a Film (by Cliff Martinez), the Critics Choice Award at the Broadcast Film Critics Association Awards for Best Action Movie, Best Director, Best Picture and Breakthrough Film Artist at the Central Ohio Film Critics Association, Best Original Score (Martinez) and Best Supporting Actor (Brooks) at the Chicago Film Critics Association Awards, Best Supporting Actor (Brooks) at the Florida Film Critics Circle Awards, Best Foreign Film at the Fotogramas de Plata, Best Director from the Las Vegas Film Critics Society, a Top Films Award from the National Board of Review, Best Supporting Actor (Brooks) at the National Society of Film Critics Awards, the San Francisco Film Critics Circle Awards and the New York Film Critics Circle Awards, Best Director at the San Diego Film Critics Society Awards.

Refn wanted to cast Drive actress Christina Hendricks as Wonder Woman, but later focused on Batgirl instead.

The Bangkok-set crime film Only God Forgives, starring Ryan Gosling and Kristin Scott Thomas, premiered in competition at the 2013 Cannes Film Festival. The film was awarded the Sydney Film Prize at the 2013 Sydney Film Festival.

Liv Corfixen, Refn's wife, directed the documentary My Life Directed by Nicolas Winding Refn, centered on the life and work of Refn and their relationship. The documentary film premiered on July 17, 2014, in Denmark.

In September 2011, Refn said his next film would be I Walk with the Dead, with Carey Mulligan  slated to play the lead; she was co-star of Drive. According to Refn, it will be a horror-movie sex thriller that may be set in Tokyo or Los Angeles.

In 2013, Refn confirmed I Walk with the Dead as his next project. In October 2013 playwright Polly Stenham was confirmed to write the screenplay with Refn. They stated that the film will have an all-female cast. Refn admitted that he asked Stenham to write the screenplay to compensate for his perceived inability to write female characters.

On November 3, 2014, his production company Space Rocket Nation, alongside its co-producers Gaumont Film Company and Wild Bunch, announced that Refn's next film would be titled The Neon Demon, rather than I Walk With The Dead. The Neon Demon would be filmed in Los Angeles, California, in early 2015. The film stars Elle Fanning, Karl Glusman, Keanu Reeves, Christina Hendricks, Abbey Lee, Jena Malone and Bella Heathcote. On April 14, 2016, it was announced that the film would be competing for the Palme d'Or at the 2016 Cannes Film Festival, marking it as the third consecutive film directed by Refn that had competed for the Palme d'Or.

Adverts and short films 
He directed an extended Gucci commercial featuring Blake Lively and himself in a brief cameo, which premiered at the 2012 Venice Film Festival. The short film is entitled Gucci Premiere. He also directed the music video for his frequent collaborator Peter Peter's band Bleeder, which featured his wife Liv Corfixen as a crazy nurse. He also directed a series of Lincoln commercials starring Matthew McConaughey.

Future projects 
On August 14, 2016, Refn announced via his Twitter page that his next project would be titled The Avenging Silence, calling it "Ian Fleming + William Burroughs + NWR = The Avenging Silence" and posted images for Fleming's novel Dr. No and for Burroughs's novel The Soft Machine. Variety reported that producer Lene Borglum described the purported plot as following: "[A] former European spy [accepts] a mission from a Japanese businessman to take down the head of a Yakuza boss in Japan".

Teaching 
In 2019, Cannes Film Festival announced that it would host a masterclass with Refn on working in Film and TV.

Unrealized projects 
In 2005, it was reported that Refn co-wrote a screenplay with Nicholas St. John titled Billy’s People.  However, Refn scrapped the project because his films Bleeder (1999) and Fear X (2003) were box office disasters.

In 2009, Refn expressed high interest in developing a film biopic of notoriously polemic and controversial English occultist, Aleister Crowley, with Bronson star, Tom Hardy, as Crowley. Refn admitted to not knowing anything about the life of the magician and referred to Crowley as a "Satan-worshipping cult personality". That year, he became attached to direct a modern retelling of Strange Case of Dr Jekyll and Mr Hyde with Keanu Reeves playing the titular roles.  The working title of the film was Jekyll.  According to an interview with SciFi Wire, he wanted the film to take place "in modern America and use as much credible science as possible."  However, in February 2010, Winding Refn dropped out of the project in order to work on Drive.

In 2010, Refn planned to direct Paul Schrader's script The Dying of the Light with Harrison Ford as the lead.  However, in February 2010,
Winding Refn exited the project. In September 2011 during promotion for Drive, he claimed that Ford did not want his character to die, causing the film production to fall apart.
 Schrader directed the film, which starred Nicolas Cage and Anton Yelchin in the Ford and Tatum roles. Following its release, Refn joined with Schrader, Cage, and Yelchin in protesting the studio's final edit of the project, which was not to Schrader's original vision.

Channing Tatum, who was to co-star with Ford in The Dying of the Light, originally wanted Refn to direct Magic Mike (2012), which Steven Soderbergh came to direct.

In 2012, Refn became involved in the direction of a remake of the 1980s crime show The Equalizer starring Denzel Washington, but the deal with Sony fell through for unknown reasons. The adaptation The Equalizer ended up being directed by Antoine Fuqua for release in 2014.

In July 2016, Refn revealed that he had turned down the offer to direct the James Bond movie Spectre.

Directing style 
Refn has spoken about characterization in his films:

Refn prefers to shoot his films in chronological order: "I read that [director John Cassavetes] had done it on some of his films, so I thought, 'That's a pretty cool approach.' And after I did it on my first movie, I felt, 'How can you do a movie any other way?' It's like a painting—you paint the movie as you go along, and I like the uncertainty of not knowing exactly how it's going to turn out." Refn spoke more about shooting in chronological order in September 2011, in reference to Drive:

On his approach to working with actors, Refn has said:

Refn's color blindness has influenced his style: "I can't see mid-colors. That's why all my films are very contrasted, if it were anything else I couldn't see it."

Influences
Refn has cited viewing The Texas Chain Saw Massacre (1974) as inspiration for his filmmaking career:

Refn has said numerous times that his largest cinematic influence has been the director Alejandro Jodorowsky (to whom Refn dedicated Only God Forgives), of whom he has said:

He stated that for his first film Pusher, he stole everything from Gillo Pontecorvo's 1965 Oscar-nominated The Battle of Algiers and the 1980 Italian horror film Cannibal Holocaust. Also influential to his film viewing experience were John Cassavetes' 1976 film The Killing of a Chinese Bookie and Kevin Smith's 1994 indie film Clerks.

Other favorites include Tokyo Drifter (1966), Kwaidan (1965), My Life as a Dog (1985), Man on Fire (2004), Pretty Woman (1990), Scorpio Rising (1963), Vampyr (1932),  Videodrome (1980), Suspiria (1977), Cloverfield (2008), Flesh for Frankenstein (1973), Liquid Sky (1982), The Shining (1980), Night of the Living Dead (1968), To Die For (1995), Sixteen Candles (1984), The Night of the Hunter (1955), Alien (1979) and Beauty and the Beast (1946). Some of the films Refn help restored include Ron Ormond's The Burning Hell (1974), Curtis Harrington's Night Tide (1961) and Ray Dennis Steckler's Wild Guitar (1962).

Personal life 
Refn is married to actress Liv Corfixen, with whom he has two daughters.

After making the movie Fear X, Refn was heavily in debt. The story of Refn's recovery is recorded in the documentary Gambler, directed by Phie Ambo. At the 2011 Cannes Film Festival, Refn said that he was repulsed by the controversial remarks by Lars von Trier about Adolf Hitler, calling them unacceptable.

His wife, Liv Corfixen, wrote and directed a documentary entitled My Life Directed by Nicolas Winding Refn, which chronicles the "behind the scenes" experience of shooting Only God Forgives when the entire family had to be relocated to Thailand. The documentary has received positive reviews after premiering at Fantastic Fest and Beyond Fest. The soundtrack for the documentary is also composed entirely by Cliff Martinez, with the last track "Disconnected" composed, written and sung by Julian Winding, Refn's nephew.

Filmography

Film